The Uganda men's national lacrosse team represents Uganda in international lacrosse competitions. It is organized by the Uganda Lacrosse.

History
The Uganda national team made their international debut in 2014 by featuring in the World Lacrosse Championship for the first time at the 2014 edition held in Denver, United States where they were mentored by American coach Tanner Scales. They were also the first African team to feature in the tournament. Their game against South Korea was their first win in the tournament, winning over their Asian opponents, 10-9. They finished 34th among 38th competitors.

They entered the 2018 World Lacrosse Championship in Israel for their second appearance in the international lacrosse competition. They placed 40th in this tournament. They are currently led by Ugandan born and raised coach, Oriana Patrick.

Uganda overcame rivals Kenya 9-8 at the Kenton College Preparatory School in Nairobi city on 19/11/2022 to secure a place at the 2023 World Lacrosse Championship in San Diego, United States of America (USA)

The 30 countries to play at the 2023 World Lacrosse Men championship

United States of America (USA), Canada, Haudenosaunee, Australia, England, Japan, Israel, Germany, Scotland, Ireland, Wales, Italy, Latvia, Switzerland, Netherlands, Austria, Sweden, Czech Republic, Poland, France, Denmark, Puerto Rico, Jamaica, Mexico, Peru, Philippines, New Zealand, Hong Kong – China, Korea, Uganda

Competitive record

World Lacrosse Championship

References

National lacrosse teams
Lacrosse
2014 establishments in Uganda